Nomatter Mutasa (born 28 October 1995) is a Zimbabwean cricketer. She played for the Zimbabwe women's national cricket team in the 2017 Women's Cricket World Cup Qualifier in February 2017. In the tournament, she was the highest wicket-taker for Zimbabwe, with 6 dismissals. She made her Women's Twenty20 International (WT20I) debut for Zimbabwe against Namibia women on 5 January 2019.

In November 2021, she was named in Zimbabwe's team for the 2021 Women's Cricket World Cup Qualifier tournament in Zimbabwe. She played in Zimbabwe's first match of the tournament, against Thailand.

References

External links
 

1995 births
Living people
Zimbabwean women cricketers
Zimbabwe women Twenty20 International cricketers
Sportspeople from Kwekwe
Rhinos women cricketers